Lapland Air Defence Regiment is a unit of the Finnish Army located in Rovaniemi. It was founded in 1989 as a brigade-level unit with the name Lapland Air Defence Regiment. In 2015, the Regiment became a battalion-level unit and part of the Jaeger Brigade.

Organisation 
Rovaniemi Air Defence Battalion (Rovaniemen Ilmatorjuntapatteristo, ROVITPSTO)
1st Air Defence Battery
2nd Air Defence Battery
The Airbase Support Company

1st Air Defence Battery trains conscripts for ground based air defence systems and guns such as Crotale NG and 23 ITK 61. 2nd Air Defence Battery trains most of the NCOs of the Battalion as well as some ground based air defence support troops, for example targeting radar platoons and operation centres. The Airbase Support Company trains logistics platoons of varying types. It also trains all the military drivers of the battalion and all the military police personnel of the Jaeger Brigade.

The Air Force conscripts with special training such as assistant aircraft mechanician NCOs who serve in Lapland Air Command are administratively part of the Airbase Support Company of the Battalion.

Equipment 
 Crotale NG (Ilmatorjuntaohjus 90M Crotale NG)
 ZU-23-2 (23 ITK 61 and 23 ITK 95)

References

External links
Lapin Ilmatorjuntarykmentti (in Finnish)

Artillery units and formations of Finland
Military units and formations established in 1989
Rovaniemi